FK Bačka 1901 is a football club from Subotica in Bačka, Serbia. It is the longest running club in Serbia and also the oldest within the former Yugoslavia. Founded in 1901 in Subotica, the club's colors are red and white, while the club's anthem is Pivaj Bačka veselo.

History
The club was founded in 1901, during Austro-Hungarian administration. Bačka 1901 played a big role in a cultural and sport autonomy of Bunjevci Croats in Bačka during the Austro-Hungarian period.

Its first name was Bácska Szabadkai Athletikai Club, since it was registered by the Austro-Hungarian authorities in Hungarian language.

In its early years, the club played in the leagues of the Austro-Hungarian Kingdom of Hungary, regularly winning in the southern league. After beginning of the First World War, the region became part of the Kingdom of Serbs, Croats and Slovenes (renamed Yugoslavia in 1929), and the club participated in the Yugoslav championship twice, in its 1923 inaugural season and in 1925. During this time the club was named JSD Bačka.

In 1941, during the Axis occupation of Yugoslavia, Bačka was attached to Horthy's Hungary and the club was forced to compete in the Hungarian League, where it entered competition in its third-tier. In 1945 the communist authorities renamed the club to HAŠK Građanski (Croat Academical Sports Club Građanski) in their attempt to Croatize Slavic populations of Bačka region. Soon after the club was renamed to FD Sloboda. Later, it was renamed to FD Zvezda, and in 1963, the club returned the name Bačka.

FK Bačka 1901 were promoted to the Serbian League Vojvodina, national third tier in 2013.

In May 2007 the president of the club became Dragan Vujković, former member of the Yugoslav national boxing team and silver medalist from two World Amateur Championships.

Names through history
"Bácska" SAC
JAD "Bačka"
HŠK "Bačka"
HAŠK "Građanski"
FD "Sloboda"
FD "Zvezda"
FK "Bačka"

Notable players
These players are listed in the club's official website.  In alphabetic order:

 Csaba Béres
 Zoran Bogešić
 Stanko Bogojević
 Ivica Bošnjak
 Predrag Bošnjak, Hungarian national team player
 Ivan Budimčević
 Mijo Bukvić
 Antun Copko
 Beno Cvijanov
 Mirko Evetović
 Stjepan Gabrić
 Lajoš Jakovetić, Yugoslav national team player
 Mihalj Kečkeš, Yugoslav national team player
 István Kenyeres
 Nesto Kopunović
 Andrija Kujundžić, Yugoslav national team player
 Zoltan Kujundžić
 Gordan Lazić
 Josip Lerinc
 Tomo Malagurski
 Zoran Mandić
 Remija Marcikić, Yugoslav national team player and Southern Hungarian selected team player
 Nikola Matković

 Tihomir Ognjanov, Yugoslav national team player
 Marinko Poljaković
 Josip Rajčić
 Tibor Rehm
 Pero Remeš
 Antun Rudinski, Yugoslav national team player
 Nikola Sadojević
 Ivan Sarić
 Tomislav Sivić
 Ivan Skenderović
 Dezider Szlezák
 Attila Szabados
 József Szili
 Radovan Šimun
 Slobodan Šujica
 Zoran Trivunov
 László Varga
 Dejan Vilotić
 Marko Vujković
 Zoltán Wagner
 Miloš Zakić
 Josip Zemko, Yugoslav national team player

Besides these above, among Bačka's legendary persons are Lajos Vermes, Nikola Matković and Đuro Stantić.

For the list of former and current players with Wikipedia article, please see: :Category:FK Bačka 1901 players.

Coaches
List of all coaches:

 Zoltán Wagner (1901–1906)
 Gyula Gruber (1906–1914)
 Ivan Milašin (1914–1920)
 Aleksandar Perl (1920–1924)
 Ferenc Nagy (1924–1926)
 Aleksandar Perl (1926–1930)
 Andrija Kujundžić - Čiča (1930–1941)
 Lajoš Gencel (1945–1946)
 Miroslav Stojanović (1948–1949)
 Laslo Varga (1949–1950)
 Lajoš Gencel (1950–1951)
 Josip Vad (1951–1952)
 Lajoš Gencel (1952–1953)
 Željko Sabanov (1953–1954)
 Beno Cvijanov (1954–1955)
 Gustav Matković (1955–1959)
 Aleksandar Petrović (1959–1960)
 Laslo Varga (1960–1963)
 Jožef Koras (1963–1965)
 Gustav Matković (1965–1966)
 Laslo Varga (1966–1969)
 Tihomir Ognjanov (1969–1971)
 Franjo Čović (1971–1972)
 Miloš Glončak (1972–1974)
 Josip Zemko (1974–1977)
 Branko Roksandić (1977–1978)
 Đorđe Palatinus

 Tome Malagurski
 Dobrivoje Trivić (1978–1979)
 Lajčo Jakovetić (1979–1980)
 Branko Roksandić (1980–1981)
 Josip Rajčić (1981–1986)
 Budisav Pajić (1986–1987)
 Slobodan Šujica (1987–1988)
 Budisav Pajić (1988–1989)
 Slobodan Šujica (1989–1990)
 Josip Rajčić (1990–1991)
 Josip Zemko
 Josip Lerinc
 Slobodan Šujica (1991)
 Hajrudin Saračević (1991–1992)
 Slobodan Kustudić (1992–1993)
 Josip Zemko
 Marko Vujković
 Danilo Mandić (1993–1994)
 Josip Zemko
 Marko Vujković
 Danilo Mandić (1994–1995)
 Josip Rajčić
 István Gligor (1995–1996)
 Danilo Mandić (1996–1997)
 Josip Rajčić
 Marko Vujković (1998–1999)
 Josip Rajčić (1999–2001)

FK Bačka in art
Croatian writer from Bačka, Milivoj Prćić, has written a monodrama, Pivaj Bačka veselo, dedicated to this club.

Later in 2006, Rajko Ljubič made a movie of the same name after Prćić's work.

References

External links
 
 Vojvodina league - East at SrbijaSport
 Radio Subotica «Crveno bijela zabava» podsjetila na povijest «Bačke»
 
 
 Radio Subotica «Crveno-bijela zabava» NK «Bačka 1901»

FK Bačka 1901
Football clubs in Serbia
Football clubs in Vojvodina
Sport in Subotica
Association football clubs established in 1901
Croats of Vojvodina
Bunjevci
1901 establishments in Serbia